Hastings and District Electric Tramways operated a tramway service in Hastings between 1905 and 1929.

History

The tramway opened in two sections which operated independently until 1907. Following the passing of legislation permitting the installation of the tramways, services started in Hastings on 31 July 1905.

A second depot was built at Bulverhythe for services between St Leonards-on-Sea and Bexhill which started on 9 April 1906. That line finally reached Cooden Beach on 28 July 1906. On 12 January 1907, the two systems were connected along the seafront.

The trams ran as far as Bexhill, and were worked by overhead electric wires, except for the stretch along the seafront from Bo-Peep to the Memorial, which was initially worked by the Dolter Stud contact system due to concerns that the overhead cabling would obstruct sea views, a sentiment that was cemented in the legislation permitting the tram service. Following unsuccessful attempts to mount trams for this route with a small petrol engine/generator combination and a further act of Parliament, overhead electrification was extended to this section in 1921.

Closure

Under the 1905 Act, the councils had an option to buy Hastings Tramway Co. in 1925. They didn't, so the company reviewed its options. The  tramway service closed on 15 May 1929 and was replaced by trolleybuses on the same routes, except for a short section of private right of way on Pebsham Marsh, off Bexhill Rd and a new link through High St.

Two tramcars survive, 48 and 56. Both are under restoration by the Hastings Tramway Club.

References

External links
 Hastings Tramways Club
 Hastings Tramways at the British Tramway Company Badges and Buttons website
 Hastings Local History Wiki - Trams

Tram transport in England
3 ft 6 in gauge railways in England
Transport in Hastings